Tom Mercer Girdler (19 May 1877 – 4 February 1965) was an American businessperson who served as the first president of Republic Steel.

Biography
Girdler was born in Silver Creek, Clark County, Indiana in 1877. He graduated with a mechanical engineering degree from Lehigh University. After his graduation, he started his career with Buffalo Forge Company. A year later, he became a foreman for the Oliver Iron and Steel Company.

In 1943, he published his autobiography.

He retired in 1956 as the chairperson of Republic Steel.

Personal life
Girdler married four times and had two sons and two daughters.

References

1877 births
1965 deaths
American business executives